45th Infantry Division  may refer to:

 45th Infantry Division (Russian Empire)
 45th Infantry Division (United Kingdom)
 45th Infantry Division (United States)